Adnan Kojic (born 28 October 1995) is a Swedish football defender who plays for Kalmar.

References

External links 
 

1995 births
Living people
Swedish footballers
Association football defenders
Ettan Fotboll players
Superettan players
Allsvenskan players
IFK Norrköping players
IF Sylvia players
Halmstads BK players
AFC Eskilstuna players
Varbergs BoIS players
Kalmar FF players